Opp City School District is a school district in Covington County, Alabama.

References

External links
 

Education in Covington County, Alabama